Said Kandi (also Romanized as Sa‘īd Kandī) is a village in Oryad Rural District, in the Central District of Mahneshan County, Zanjan Province, Iran. At the 2006 census, its population was 416, in 73 families.

References 

Populated places in Mahneshan County